Moksi may refer to:

 Mõksi, a village in the Võru County of Estonia
 Moksi (Korpilahti), since 2009 part of Jyväskylä, Finland
 Moksi (DJs), with Stmpd Rcrds